Libyan Olympic Committee is the National Olympic Committee representing Libya.

See also
 Libya at the Olympics

External links 
Official website (in Arabic)
Libya (IOC)

Libya
Olympic
Libya at the Olympics